Itaú Securities is an American securities firm based in New York City, United States that is a subsidiary of Brazilian bank Itaú Unibanco. It is a broker dealer (est: 2002) that specialize in Brazilian securities for US institutional investors. , the companies market capitalization was US$ 41.7 billion.

Itaú’s shares are traded on the New York Stock Exchange. The company is regulated by the National Association of Securities Dealers (NASD)and has a net capital of US$ 30million.

Itaú Corretora and Itaú BBA, the investment banking arm of the group, participated actively in Brazilian IPO’s and block-trade operations, such as Natura, GOL, PIBB, ALL, WEG, Braskem, EdB, Tractebel, Vivax, Gafisa, Totvs, Dasa, Duratex, Eletropaulo, Profarma, Terna and Perdigao consolidating its position as one of the leading distributors in the Brazilian capital markets. Banco Itaú Holding Financeira (ADR: ITU) is a multiple bank under the supervision of the Central Bank of Brazil and one of the largest financial institutions in Brazil.

Presidents of Itau 
Sérgio Millerman, and Thomas Deocoene are the two Presidents of today's Itau.

See also 
Development finance institution
List of companies of Brazil
List of largest Brazilian companies

References

External links 
Press release r.e. Itau's implementation of OpenLink trading software

Financial services companies based in New York City